Pólus Palace Golf Club was a golf course in Hungary. It was built by Péter Pólus, a Hungarian entrepreneur. It is privately owned.

It hosted the Polus Palace Masters Cup golf tournament, sponsored by Chevrolet in 2005. The course also supports practising. The  course has a day and night driving range with professional golfers offering instructions. A series of tournaments are being held from early spring till fall.

Registered players of the Club sometimes participate on charity golf events.

References

External links
Official website

Golf clubs and courses in Hungary